Ctenocheirodon pristis is a species of characin native to South America that can grow up to 3.4 cm long (only 3.3 for males).  It is the only known member of its genus. Its specific name comes from the Greek word pristis, which means saw. This refers to the projected fins on the underside of the fish.

Habitat 
C. pristis is a freshwater fish and it lives in the drainage basin of the Rio Tocantins in South America. It lives in areas of slow-moving water over river bottoms with little vegetation. As a result of the location, C. pristis lives exclusively in tropical areas.

References

Characidae
Characiformes genera
Monotypic ray-finned fish genera
Fish described in 2012